Gyümai is a town in Darlag County, Qinghai, China. The seat of Darlag County is situated in the Town of Gyümai.

Gyümai has a population of about 8,700. Most people live on the south side of the Yellow River.

References

Populated places in Qinghai
Township-level divisions of Qinghai
Golog Tibetan Autonomous Prefecture